Col des Montets (elevation ) is a mountain pass in the French Alps in the Haute-Savoie department of France. It is on the road between Chamonix, the Swiss Col de la Forclaz and Martigny in the canton of Valais, Switzerland.

The pass is generally open in winter, but it can be closed in extreme weather and frequently requires snow chains and/or winter tires. Conditions can be checked with Chamonix tourist office. The railway tunnel of the Saint-Gervais–Vallorcine railway
has been modified to also carry road traffic on a convoy basis between trains when the pass is closed.

Elizabeth Robins Pennell bicycled through the pass in the 1890s.

The pass appeared in the Tour de France five times from 1959 to 1977: Charly Gaul was the first rider to cross the pass in 1959.

See also
 List of highest paved roads in Europe
 List of mountain passes

References

External links 
Col des Montets on Google Maps (Tour de France classic climbs)

Montets
Montets
Landforms of Haute-Savoie
Transport in Auvergne-Rhône-Alpes